Phygadeuontini is a tribe of ichneumon wasps in the family Ichneumonidae. It is the only tribe in the subfamily Phygadeuontinae. There are about 123 genera in 12 subtribes worldwide.

Classification 
The following classification of Phygadeuontini is based on Wahl (2014):
 Subtribe Acrolytina
 Acidnus Townes, 1970a — Neotropical
 Acrolyta Förster, 1869 — Ethiopian, Holarctic, Oriental
 Brachedra Townes, 1970a — Neotropical
 Cormobius Townes, 1970a — Nearctic, Neotropical
 Diaglyptella Seyrig, 1952 — Ethiopian
 Diaglyptelloides Aubert, 1993 — Palearctic
 Diaglyptidea Viereck, 1913 — Holarctic, Neotropical, Oriental c g b
 Diatora Förster, 1869 — Ethiopian, Oriental, Palearctic
 Encrateola Strand, 1916 — worldwide except Australian
 Eudelus Förster, 1869 — Holarctic
 Isdromas Förster, 1869 c g b — worldwide except Palearctic
 Lysibia Förster, 1869 c g b — Holarctic, Neotropical, Oriental
 Micraris Townes, 1970a — Oriental
 Neopimpla Ashmead, 1900 — Ethiopian, Nearctic
 Sozites Seyrig, 1952 — Ethiopian (Townes & Townes, 1973)
 Stenotes Townes, 1970a — Neotropical
 Trachaner Townes, 1970a — Neotropical
 Subtribe Bathytrichina
 Apophysius Cushman, 1922 — Oriental
 Bathythrix Förster, 1869 i c g b — worldwide except Australian
 Chrysocryptus Cameron, 1902 — Oriental
 Retalia Seyrig, 1952 — Ethiopian, Oriental, Palearctic
 Rhabdosis Townes, 1970a — Neotropical
 Surculus Townes, 1970a — Neotropical
 Subtribe Chiroticina
 Asmenophylax Gauld, 1984 — Australian
 Astomaspis Förster, 1869 — Australian, Ethiopian, Oriental
 Bentyra Cameron, 1905 — Oriental
 Bodedia Seyrig, 1952 — Ethiopian
 Chirotica Förster, 1869 — worldwide c g b
 Diracela Townes, 1973 — Ethiopian
 Dolichomastix Ceballos, 1924 — Ethiopian
 Epelaspis Townes, 1970a — Ethiopian, Neotropical
 Fractipons Townes, 1970a — Neotropical
 Gabia Seyrig, 1952 — Ethiopian
 Handaoia Seyrig, 1952 — worldwide except Nearctic
 Lienella Cameron, 1905 (January) — Australian, Ethiopian, Oriental
 Lissaspis Townes, 1970a — Neotropical
 Mamelia Seyrig, 1952 — Ethiopian
 Orientohemiteles Uchida, 1932 — Oriental
 Palpostilpnus Aubert, 1961 — Oriental
 Paraglyptus Seyrig, 1952 — Ethiopian
 Paraphylax Förster, 1869 — Australian, Ethiopian, Oriental, Palearctic
 Singalissaspis Jussila, 1998 — Oriental
 Subtribe Cremnodina
 Cremnodes Förster, 1850 — Holarctic
 Scrobiculus Townes, 1970a — Neotropical
 Vestibulum Townes, 1970a — Neotropical
 Subtribe Endaseina
 Amphibulus Kriechbaumer, 1893 — Holarctic, Neotropical
 Cisaris Townes, 1970a — Oriental, Palearctic
 Coptomystax Townes, 1970a — Oriental
 Endasys Förster, 1869 i c g b — Holarctic
 Glyphicnemis Förster, 1869 c g b — Holarctic
 Grasseiteles Aubert, 1965 — Palearctic
 Medophron Förster, 1869 c g b — Holarctic
 Meringops Townes, 1970a — Australian, Neotropical (Gauld, 1984)
 Tryonocryptus Gauld & Holloway, 1983 — Australian
 Subtribe Ethelurgina
 Apoglutus Townes, 1970a — Oriental
 Ethelurgus Förster, 1869 — Holarctic, Neotropical
 Zamicrotoridea Viereck, 1917
 Rhembobius Förster, 1869 — Holarctic
 Subtribe Gelina
 Agasthenes Förster, 1869 — Hawaii, Holarctic
 Blaspidotes Förster, 1869 — Palearctic (Schwarz, 1995)
 Catalytus Förster, 1851 — Palearctic
 Dichrogaster Doumerc, 1855 c g b — worldwide
 Formocrytpus Uchida, 1931 — Oriental
 Gelis Thunberg, 1827 c g b — worldwide
 Thaumatogelis Schmiedeknecht, 1933 — Palearctic (Schwarz, 1995)
 Townostilpnus Aubert, 1961 — Oriental, Palearctic
 Xenolytus Förster, 1869 — Australian, Holarctic, Oriental
 Subtribe Hemitelina
 Aclastus Förster, 1869 — worldwide
 Amblyclastus Gauld, 1984 — Australian
 Anurotropus Cushman, 1924 — Nearctic (Horstmann, 1992)
 Austriteles Gauld, 1984 — Australian
 Glyphaclastus Gauld, 1984 — Australian
 Gynpetomorpha Förster, 1869 — Palearctic (Horstmann, 1992)
 Hemiteles Gravenhorst, 1829 — Holarctic, Oriental
 Obsiphaga Morley, 1907 — Holarctic
 Pleurogyrus Townes, 1970a — Holarctic
 Polyaulon Förster, 1869 c g b — Holarctic
 Xiphulcus Townes, 1970a — Holarctic
 Subtribe Mastrina
 Aclosmation Gauld, 1984 — Australian
 Amydraulax Cushman, 1922 — Nearctic
 Apotemnus Cushman, 1940 — Nearctic
 Bilira Townes, 1970a — Neotropical
 Brachypimpla Strobl, 1902 — Palearctic
 Charitopes Förster, 1869 — Ethiopian, Holarctic, Neotropical (Townes, 1983)
 Clypeoteles Horstmann, 1974 — Palearctic
 Distathma Townes, 1970a — Neotropical, Oriental, Palearctic (Horstmann, 1978 & 1992)
 Fianoniella Horstmann, 1992 — Holarctic
 Helcostizus Förster, 1869 c g b — Holarctic
 Indovia Seyrig, 1952 — Ethiopian (Horstmann, 1978 & 1992)
 Isadelphus Förster, 1869 — Holarctic (Horstmann, 1978)
 Lochetica Kriechbaumer, 1892 — Holarctic
 Mastrulus Horstmann, 1978 — Palearctic
 Mastrus Förster, 1869 c g b — Holarctic, Oriental
 Micromonodon Förster, 1869 — Palearctic (Horstmann, 1978)
 Odontoneura Förster, 1869 — Palearctic (Horstmann, 1978 & 1992)
 Pygocryptus Roman, 1925 c g b — Holarctic
 Teluncus Townes, 1970a — Neotropical
 Zoophthorus Förster, 1869 — Palearctic (Horstmann, 1978)
 Subtribe Phygadeuontina
 Arotrephes Townes, 1970a — Holarctic
 Boleslawia Sawoniewcz, 1996 — Palearctic
 Cephalobaris Kryger, 1915 — Palearctic (Horstmann, 1992)
 Ceratophygadeuon Viereck, 1924 — Ethiopian, Holarctic
 Gnotus Förster, 1869 — Holarctic, Oriental
 Hedylus Förster, 1869 — Holarctic (Carlson, 1979)
 Leptocryptoides Horstmann, 1976 — Palearctic
 Megacara Townes, 1970a — Holarctic
 Oecotelma Townes, 1970a — Holarctic
 Orthizema Förster, 1869 c g b — Holarctic
 Phygadeuon Gravenhorst, 1829 i c g b — Holarctic, Neotropical
 Platyrhabdus Townes, 1970a — Palearctic
 Stibeutes Förster, 1869 — Holarctic
 Sulcarius Townes, 1970a i c g b — Holarctic
 Theroscopus Förster, 1850 — Holarctic, Oriental
 Tricholinum Förster, 1869 — Oriental, Palearctic
 Tropistes Gravenhorst, 1829 — Palearctic
 Uchidella Townes, 1957 — Holarctic, Oriental
 Subtribe Rothneyiina
 Hyparcha Townes, 1970a — Oriental
 Nipponaetes Uchida, 1933 — Australian, Ethiopian, Oriental
 Rothneyia Cameron, 1897 — Oriental
 Subtribe Stilpnina
 Atractodes Gravenhorst, 1829 c g b — Ethiopian, Holarctic
 Mesoleptus Gravenhorst, 1829 — Ethiopian, Oriental, Holarctic
 Exolytus Holmgren, 1858
 Stilpnus Gravenhorst, 1829 — Holarctic, Oriental
 incertae sedis
 Rhadinomastrus Gauld, 1984 — Australian
Additional data sources: i = ITIS, c = Catalogue of Life, g = GBIF, b = Bugguide.net

References

Further reading

External links

 

Parasitic wasps
Ichneumonidae
Parasitica tribes